The 2022 BRICS summit is the fourteenth  annual BRICS summit, an international relations conference attended by the heads of state or heads of government of the five member states Brazil, Russia, India, China and South Africa. It was the third time that China hosted the BRICS Summit after 2011 and 2017. The summit was hosted virtually by video conference.

BRICS extension
In addition to other countries that have expressed interest in joining the BRICS, and countries like Argentina and Iran that have applied for membership previously, Saudi Arabia, Turkey and Egypt expressed interest in joining during the summit

Participating leaders

Reserve currency 
A major development on the summit was creation of a new, basket type reserve currency. The currency, which is challenging US dollar, combines BRICS currencies and is backed by precious metals.

References

External links 
 

21st-century diplomatic conferences (BRICS)
2022 conferences
2022 in China
2022 in international relations
BRICS summits
Diplomatic conferences in China